Ronald Outridge (born 23 November 1935) is a Trinidadian cricketer. He played in one first-class match for Trinidad and Tobago in 1956/57.

See also
 List of Trinidadian representative cricketers

References

External links
 

1935 births
Living people
Trinidad and Tobago cricketers